RG-35, is a South African mine resistant ambush protected vehicle developed by Land Systems OMC, a subsidiary of BAE Systems. The RG-35 was introduced in 2009 as a 6x6 vehicle, and a 4x4 version is also under development with the designers intending to make it a new family of vehicles. Described by BAE Systems as a "new class of vehicle" combining the capabilities of a 4x4 mine protected vehicle and a 8x8 combat vehicle, the RG-35 can be utilized in a variety of roles, including command, ambulance or recovery vehicle.

Its large payload capability allows additional armour to be added to the RG-35, which can offer protection of up to STANAG 4569 level 4. It is powered by a Cummins diesel engine, although it can also accommodate hybrid electric drive. The vehicle can be fitted with light or medium gun turrets, allowing it to be equipped with a wide range of weapons.

History
Land Systems OMC, a subdivision of BAE Systems in South Africa, began development of the RG-35 in early 2008 as a private venture. Based on BAE Systems' existing RG range including the RG-31 Nyala, RG-32 Scout and the RG-33, it was intended to be a Mine Resistant Ambush Protected vehicle (MRAP) that could offer a high level of protection, high payload capability as well as a high level of cross-country mobility. Development of the vehicle was completed in a year, and it was unveiled to the public in September 2009 at the Defence Systems and Equipment International (DSEi) exhibition in London. BAE systems described it as a combination of a 4x4 mine protected vehicle and a 8x8 combat vehicle, calling it a groundbreaking new class of vehicle. The RG-35 displayed at the DSEi was the standard 6x6 version. However, BAE Systems are also developing a 4x4 version, intending to make the RG-35 into a new family of vehicles. The 4x4 version is expected to become operational by late 2010. The company has expressed confidence in obtaining orders for the RG-35, and it has been speculated that it may be submitted to the British Army's Light Protected Patrol Vehicle project as well as for the South African Army's Project Sepula, which seeks to replace their Casspir and Mamba Armoured Personnel Carriers.

Features
The 6x6 version of the vehicle can accommodate 16 personnel, including the driver. This power pack is mounted on the side of the vehicle rather than the traditional front or rear mounting. It can be replaced in 30 minutes, and this positioning of the power pack allows more internal space as well. All main systems of the vehicle are armour protected, and it also contains a dual air-conditioning system. It can be configured for use in a variety of combat roles such as a command post vehicle, an engineering vehicle, a mortar vehicle, an anti-aircraft vehicle, a recovery vehicle or even an ambulance. The RG-35 is also designed to easily accommodate hybrid electric drive.

The RG-35 can be equipped with light or medium gun turrets as well as indirect fire weapons. This allows a wide range of weapons to be used, including 12.7 mm machine guns and up to 20 mm calibre weapons. The RG-35 can be transported in an Airbus A400M or larger aircraft.

References

External links
RG-35 at baesystems.com

BAE Systems land vehicles
Armoured personnel carriers of South Africa
Six-wheeled vehicles
Military vehicles introduced in the 2000s
Armoured personnel carriers of the post–Cold War period